The 2012 FIM Superstock 1000 Cup was the fourteenth season of the FIM Superstock 1000 Cup, the eighth held under this name. The FIM Superstock 1000 championship followed the same calendar as the Superbike World Championship, with the exception that it did not venture outside of Europe, leaving the schedule at ten rounds.

Race calendar and results

Championship standings

Riders' standings

Manufacturers' standings

Entry list
 A provisional entry list was released by the Fédération Internationale de Motocyclisme on 13 February 2012.

All entries used Pirelli tyres.

References

Superstock 1000
FIM Superstock 1000 Cup seasons
FIM Superstock 1000 Cup